Acripeza is a monotypic genus of insects in the family Tettigoniidae: the single species, Acripeza reticulata (Guérin-Méneville, 1832) is found in Australia.

References

External links 
 Acripeza at the Global Biodiversity Information Facility Portal

Phaneropterinae
Tettigoniidae genera
Monotypic Orthoptera genera